De Zoeker (The Seeker) is the name of an oil windmill, located in the Zaanse Schans, Zaanstad. Its purpose is to press seeds such as linseed and rapeseed into vegetable oil.  It is the only oil mill still in operation, and is one of five remaining oil mills in the area.

The mill was built in 1672 in Zaandijk. The mill continued with few interruptions until 1968, when it was moved to the Schans.

See also 

 De Kat, Zaandam
 De Huisman, Zaandam
 De Os, Zaandam
 De Gekroonde Poelenburg, Zaandam
 Het Jonge Schaap, Zaandam

References

External links 

 Een uitgebreid fotoverslag

Windmills in North Holland
Smock mills in the Netherlands
Grinding mills in the Netherlands
Windmills completed in 1968
Zaandam